Washington Street Rowhouses is a pair of historic rowhouses located at Rochester in Monroe County, New York.  The two-story, three-bay, brick row houses were built about 1840 in the Greek Revival style.  They have pitched roofs, interior end chimneys, applied wooden cornices, and side by side entrances that adjoin the party wall.

It was listed on the National Register of Historic Places in 1985.

References

External links

Houses in Rochester, New York
Houses on the National Register of Historic Places in New York (state)
Houses completed in 1840
National Register of Historic Places in Rochester, New York